"It Takes Two" is a hit single recorded in late 1965 by Marvin Gaye and Kim Weston for Motown's Tamla label.

Produced by Weston's then-husband, longtime Gaye collaborator William "Mickey" Stevenson, and co-written by Stevenson and Sylvia Moy, "It Takes Two" centered on a romantic lyric that depicted many things in life (dreams, love, wishes, etc.) being better with two people instead of one. The single became Gaye's most successful duet single to date, later outperformed by Gaye's duets with Tammi Terrell.

Gaye and Weston's duet peaked at  14 on the Billboard Pop charts and No. 4 on Billboard′s Soul Singles chart in January 1967. "It Takes Two" was also Gaye's first major hit in the UK, where it peaked at No. 16 on the British singles charts in the spring of that same year. 

Cash Box said the single is a "rhythmic, infectious romancer that superbly matches the two fine voices."

The song was played over the closing credits of the 1995 film It Takes Two and 2002 TV adaptation of Jacqueline Wilson novel Double Act.

Personnel
All vocals by Marvin Gaye and Kim Weston
Instrumentation by The Funk Brothers and The Detroit Symphony Orchestra
Produced by William "Mickey" Stevenson

Charts

Certifications

Rod Stewart and Tina Turner version

British singer Rod Stewart and American singer Tina Turner released a cover of "It Takes Two" in 1990, which was also featured in a television advertising campaign for Pepsi. It was the lead single from Stewart's album Vagabond Heart, produced by Bernard Edwards. The duet was a European hit, peaking at No. 1 in Denmark. It also reached No. 5 in the UK and was a Top 10 single in several European countries. The song later appeared on both artists' greatest hits albums: Turner's Simply the Best (1991), and Stewart's The Very Best of Rod Stewart (2001).

Charts

Weekly charts

Year-end charts

Other cover versions
 In 1989 a Children In Need charity single was released (retitled "It Takes Two, Baby") featuring BBC Radio 1 DJs Liz Kershaw and Bruno Brookes with Jive Bunny and Londonbeat. It charted at #53 in the UK Singles chart.
 The single charted on the Canadian A/C charts in 1982 on an A/B Single hit by Susan Jacks.

References

1966 singles
1967 singles
Marvin Gaye songs
Rod Stewart songs
Tina Turner songs
Songs written by Sylvia Moy
Songs written by William "Mickey" Stevenson
Tamla Records singles
Warner Records singles
1966 songs
Song recordings produced by William "Mickey" Stevenson
Male–female vocal duets
Number-one singles in Denmark